Ken Gharial Sanctuary is a wildlife sanctuary in Panna and Chhatarpur Districts of Madhya Pradesh, India. It was established for the conservation of gharial and mugger crocodile populations in 1981.

Location 
It is located at the confluence of the Ken River and Khudar River and spread over an area of 45,201 sq. km. It is located northeast of the Khajuraho temples and north of Panna National Park. It is usually visited along with the Raneh Falls site nearby. It is closed for visitors in monsoon season.

History 

Conservation management 
The sanctuary is protected under India's Wildlife Protection Act of 1972. The sanctuary is administered by the Department of Forest.

See also 
 Panna National Park

References

External links
Ken Gharial Sanctuary 

Wildlife sanctuaries in Madhya Pradesh
Chhatarpur district
Protected areas with year of establishment missing